Resident Evil: Infinite Darkness (stylized as RESIDENT EVIL: Infinite Darkness) is an American Japanese horror-action CGI original net animation miniseries based on the video game series Resident Evil by Capcom. The series stars Resident Evil 2 protagonists Leon S. Kennedy and Claire Redfield.

Produced by TMS Entertainment and animated by Quebico, Infinite Darkness was released on July 8, 2021, on Netflix.

Premise
Set between the events of Resident Evil 4 and Resident Evil 5, the series takes place in 2006 after a hacking incident is uncovered at the White House. Leon S. Kennedy is ordered to investigate the incident, but he encounters zombies when the White House is targeted in a mysterious attack. He later meets Claire Redfield, who has been investigating a strange drawing made by a child refugee while working on a TerraSave-led mission to oversee construction of a welfare facility.

Characters
 , 
 , 
 Jason, 
 Shen May, 
 Patrick, 
 Wilson, 
 Graham, 
 Ryan,

Episodes

Production
Prior to its proper unveiling, Netflix Portugal tweeted out a teaser trailer on Twitter alongside the claim that it would be a "CGI movie", but shortly deleted the tweet afterward. Infinite Darkness was officially announced at the virtual 2020 Tokyo Game Show as a CGI series by the show's executive producer, Hiroyuki Kobayashi. At the virtual Biohazard Showcase event in April 2021, it was revealed that Eiichirō Hasumi will serve as the series' director and Yugo Kanno as composer.

Series' production is to be handled by TMS Entertainment, with animation services by Quebico.

Home media
Resident Evil: Infinite Darkness was released on DVD and Blu-ray on December 21, 2021.

Reception
On Rotten Tomatoes, the show has an approval rating of 50% with an average rating of 5.4/10, based on 22 critic reviews. The website's critics consensus reads, "Resident Evil: Infinite Darknesss superb animation captures the visceral thrills of its terrifying source material–if only the story were as gripping as the moments of terror.

Austin Jones of Paste Magazine gave the show 5 out of 10 stars, writing that "Infinite Darkness has a barrier to entry due to its heavy reliance on a preexisting investment in the greater Resident Evil series." Jonathon Wilson of Ready Steady Cut gave the show 2.5 out of 5 stars and wrote: "Resident Evil: Infinite Darkness has some pleasures for long-time fans, but it's inconsistent in every way and winds up feeling inessential." Grace Randolph of Beyond the Trailer said that "it's interesting to see this kind of animation, but the story here is just too cliche. Not as good as the other adult animated shows already available on Netflix." John Nguyen of Nerd Reactor gave the show 3 out of 5 stars: "Seeing Claire Redfield and Leon S. Kennedy together is always a treat, but Resident Evil: Infinite Darkness lacks a gripping story and engrossing supporting characters."

Sam Barsanti of The A.V. Club gave the show C+: "Nobody is going to confuse it for high art, certainly, but what didn't really work in video games and what didn't make sense in the Milla Jovovich-led movies surprisingly does work as a CG four-episode TV show." Andrew Webster of The Verge stated that "some tie-ins are meant to lure in new fans, while others are designed to appease existing ones; Infinite Darkness is most definitely the latter". Sam Stone of CBR in his review wrote: "Overall, the anime is a fun side story that offers a chance for Leon to jump back into the spotlight while evoking a past era for the franchise, deviating from horror to deliver global action." Kate Sánchez of But Why Tho? A Geek Community gave the show 7.5 out of 10 stars: "Resident Evil: Infinite Darkness is far more about geopolitical intrigue, corporate espionage, and surviving war than it is about killing zombies." Taylor Lyles of IGN gave the show 7 out of 10: "Despite predictability on who would serve as an antagonist, the bad performance and animation by certain minor characters, and the imbalance of importance and screen time for our two protagonists, Infinite Darkness is a step in the right direction." Tessa Smith of Mama's Geeky gave the show 3 out of 5: "While there are some animation and pacing issues, overall this show is not only action packed, it gives the audience a peek at what Leon & Claire were up to in between games."

Media

Comic miniseries
In October 2020, American distributor company Tokyopop announced a "manga-style" graphic novel based on the series and that it will release alongside the anime. The eventual 5 part miniseries titled Resident Evil: Infinite Darkness - The Beginning was pushed back to 8 March 2022, and then to September 2022 but is delayed again with its final release date being December 21, 2022. A graphic novel collection containing all five parts is currently scheduled for a September release of 2023.

Notes

References

External links
 
 
 

2021 anime ONAs
2023 manga
Action anime and manga
Anime based on video games
Horror anime and manga
Interquel television series
Netflix original anime
Japanese computer-animated television series
Resident Evil
Television series about viral outbreaks
Television series set in 2006
Television series set in the 2000s
Television shows set in Washington, D.C.
TMS Entertainment
Tokyopop titles
Works based on Capcom video games
Zombies in anime and manga